Taparelli may refer to:

People with the surname
Luigi Taparelli (1793–1862), Italian Catholic scholar
Taparelli d'Azeglio (1798–1866), Italian statesman, novelist and painter
Vittorio Emanuele Taparelli d'Azeglio (1816–1890), Italian diplomat and politician

See also
 Tavarelli, a surname